Auppegard is a commune in the Seine-Maritime department in the Normandy region in northern France.

Geography

Etymology
Appelgart 1160; Anglo-Norse place name æppel > apple and gardr > yard, garden. Like Applegarth (Yorkshire, Appelgard 1160 ) and Épégard (Eure, Alpegard 1199 ).

It shows, that apples have been grown in Normandy for a long time, probably already to make cider.

Population

Places of interest
 The sixteenth-century church of St.Pierre, with a twisted spire.
 The seventeenth-century château.

See also
Communes of the Seine-Maritime department

References

Communes of Seine-Maritime